In fluid dynamics and elasticity, hydroelasticity or flexible fluid-structure interaction (FSI), is a branch of science which is concerned with the motion of deformable bodies through liquids. The theory of hydroelasticity has been adapted from aeroelasticity, to describe the effect of structural response of the body on the fluid around it.

Definition
It is the analysis of the time-dependent interaction of hydrodynamic and elastic structural forces. Vibration of floating and submerged ocean structures/vessels encompasses this field of naval architecture.

Importance 
Hydroelasticity is of concern in various areas of marine technology such as:
 High-speed craft.
 Ships with the phenomena springing and whipping affecting fatigue and extreme loading
 Large scale floating structures such as floating airports , floating bridges and buoyant tunnels.
 Marine Risers.
 Cable systems and umbilicals for remotely operated or tethered underwater vehicles.
 Seismic cable systems.
 Flexible containers for water transport, oil spill recovery and other purposes.

Areas of research 

 Analytical and numerical methods in FSI.
 Techniques for laboratory and in-service investigations.
 Stochastic methods.
 Hydroelasticity-based prediction of Wave Loads and Responses.
 Impact, sloshing and shock.
 Flow induced vibration (FIV).
 Tsunami and seaquake induced responses of large marine structures.
 Devices for energy extraction.

Current research 
Analysis and design of marine structures or systems necessitates integration of hydrodynamics and structural mechanics; i.e. hydroelasticity plays the key role. There has been significant recent progress in research into the hydroelastic phenomena, and the topic of hydroelasticity is of considerable current interest.

Institutes and laboratories 

 Norwegian University of Science and Technology (NTNU), Trondheim, Norway 
 University of Southampton, Southampton, UK. 
 MARINTEK : Marine Technology Centre, Trondheim, Norway 
 MARIN : Maritime Research Institute Netherlands.
 MIT 
 University of Michigan.,
 Indian Institute of Technology Kharagpur, India.
 Saint Petersburg State University, Russia. 
 National Maritime Research Institute, Japan. 
 Research Institute of Applied Mechanics, Kyushu University, Japan. 
 Computational Fluid Dynamics Laboratory, National Taiwan University of Science and Technology, Taiwan. 
 Lee Dynamics, Houston, Texas, USA

Conferences 

 HYDROELAS : International conference on Hydroelasticity in marine technology.
 FSI : International conference on fluid-structure interaction.
 OT : Offshore Technology Conference.
 ISOPE : International Society of Offshore and Polar Engineers conference.

Journals 

 Journal of Sound and Vibration.
 Journal of Ship Research.
 Applied Ocean research. 
 Journal of Engineering Mechanics. 
 IEEE Journal of Oceanic Engineering.
 Journal of Fluids and Structures

References 
 R.E.D.Bishop and W.G.Price, "Hydroelasticity of ships"; Cambridge University Press, 1979, .
 Fumiki Kitō, "Principles of hydro-elasticity", Tokyo : Memorial Committee for Retirement of Dr. F. Kito; Distributed by Yokendo Co., 1970, LCCN 79566961.
 Edited by S.K.Chakrabarti and C.A.Brebbia, "Fluid structure interaction", Southampton; Boston: WIT, c2001, .
 Edited by S.K.Chakrabarti and C.A.Brebbia, "Fluid structure interaction and moving boundary problems IV", Southampton : WIT, c2007, .
 Edited by Subrata K. Chakrabarti, "Handbook of offshore engineering", Amsterdam ; London : Elsevier, 2005, .
 Subrata K. Chakrabarti, "Hydrodynamics of offshore structures", Southampton : Computational Mechanics ; Berlin : Springer Verlag, c1987, .
 Subrata K. Chakrabarti, "Nonlinear methods in offshore engineering", Amsterdam ; New York : Elsevier, 1990, .
 Edited by S.K. Chakrabarti, "Numerical models in fluid-structure interaction", Southampton, UK ; Boston : WIT, c2005, .
 Subrata Kumar Chakrabarti, "Offshore structure modeling", Singapore ; River Edge, N.J. : World Scientific, c1994, (OCoLC)ocm30491315.
 Subrata K. Chakrabarti, "The theory and practice of hydrodynamics and vibration", River Edge, N.J. : World Scientific, c2002, .
 D. Karmakar, J. Bhattacharjee and T. Sahoo, "Expansion formulae for wave structure interaction problems with applications in hydroelasticity ", Intl. J. Engng. Science, 2007: 45(10), 807–828.
 Storhaug, Gaute, "Experimental investigation of wave induced vibrations and their effect on the fatigue loading of ships", PhD dissertation, NTNU, 2007:133, .
 Storhaug, Gaute et al. "Measurements of wave induced hull girder vibrations of an ore carrier in different trades", Journal of Offshore Mechanics and Arctic Engineering, Nov. 2007.
 Ottó Haszpra, "Modelling hydroelastic vibrations", London ; San Francisco : Pitman, 1979, .
 Hirdaris, S.E., Price, W.G and Temarel, P. (2003). Two- and three-dimensional hydroelastic modelling of a bulker in regular waves. Marine Structures 16(8):627-658, doi:10.1016/j.marstruc.2004.01.005
 Hirdaris, S.E. and Temarel, P. (2009). Hydroelasticity of Ships - recent advances and future trends. Proceedings (Part M) of the Institution of Mechanical Engineers : Journal of Engineering for the Maritime Environment, 223(3):305-330, doi:10.1243/14750902JEME160 
 Temarel, P. and Hirdaris, S.E. Eds.(2009). Hydroelasticity in Marine Technology - Proceedings of the 5th International Conference HYELAS'09, Published by the University of Southampton - UK, 

Fluid dynamics